Doren is a municipality in the district of Bregenz in the western Austrian state of Vorarlberg.

Geography 
The municipality of Doren is located in the northwest of the Bregenz Forest. It lies about two-thirds on the south side of the Sulzbergstock, which belongs to the Molasse basin, and about one third on Sulzbergstock's north side.

The community boundaries are formed by the three rivers Weißach, Bregenzer Ach, and Rotach. It also borders on five other Vorarlberg communities in the district of Bregenz (clockwise, starting in the north): Sulzberg, Krumbach, Langenegg, Alberschwende, and Langen bei Bregenz.

Doren is a member of the German-Austrian community project Naturpark Nagelfluhkette. The surrounding landscape is characterized by forests, natural monuments, numerous waterways, bogs, and biotopes.

Culture

Parish church Doren 

In 1823, the original church was built according to the plans of the District Office Bregenz. Its consecration took place in 1826, and in 1853 it was made the parish church.

Coat of arms 

The coat of arms, inspired by a design of the Schruns artist and heraldist Konrad Honold, was created in 1969. It shows the two rivers Weißach and Bregenzerach; the deer antlers stand for hunting.

Population

External links 

 Community website

References

Cities and towns in Bregenz District